Luís García (born 16 March 1923) was a Portuguese athlete. He competed in the men's triple jump at the 1948 Summer Olympics.

References

External links

1923 births
Possibly living people
Athletes (track and field) at the 1948 Summer Olympics
Portuguese male triple jumpers
Olympic athletes of Portugal